Ilias Chatzitheodoridis (born 5 November 1997) is a Greek professional footballer who plays as a left-back for Super League club Panetolikos. 

Chatzitheodoridis is a product of the Arsenal academy and played senior football in England for Brentford and Cheltenham Town, before returning to Greece to join Panathinaikos in 2018. He transferred to Panetolikos in 2022.

Club career

Arsenal 
A left back, Chatzitheodoridis began his career in his native Greece, playing for Mas Kallitheakos and training part-time with Arsenal's Greek academy. After impressing on trial, he signed a two-year scholarship deal with the Premier League club's principle academy in England on 6 June 2014. Chatzitheodoridis made 44 appearances and scored one goal for the U18 team over the course of two seasons, before being released in June 2016.

Brentford 
Chatzitheodoridis joined the B team at Championship club Brentford on trial during 2016–17 pre-season and he impressed enough to sign a one-year professional contract on 6 August 2016. An injury crisis at left back saw Chatzitheodoridis win his maiden first team call up for a league match versus Wolverhampton Wanderers on 24 September 2016, but remained an unused substitute during the 3–1 defeat. He signed a new two-year contract extension in March 2017.

The departure of second-choice left back Tom Field on loan for the first half of the 2017–18 season allowed Chatzitheodoridis to make his senior debut with a start in the Bees' 3–1 EFL Cup first round extra time win over AFC Wimbledon on 8 August 2017. He remained on the pitch until the 97th minute, when he was substituted for Henrik Dalsgaard. He played the full 90 minutes of the 4–1 victory over rivals Queens Park Rangers in the following round and on 7 September, manager Dean Smith reported that Chatzitheodoridis would begin training with the first team on a regular basis. A season-ending injury to Rico Henry in late September saw Chatzitheodoridis become the backup to stand-in left backs Josh Clarke and Yoann Barbet during the first half of the 2017–18 season. On 19 January 2018, Chatzitheodoridis joined League Two club Cheltenham Town on loan and was an ever-present starter in the remaining 18 matches of 2017–18 season. Despite being contracted for one further season, Chatzitheodoridis was released on a free transfer in July 2018.

Panathinaikos 
On 23 July 2018, Chatzitheodoridis returned to Greece to join Super League club Panathinaikos on a free transfer. He finished a mid-table 2018–19 season with 25 appearances and four goals. Prior to his 2019–20 season being ended by an ankle injury, Chatzitheodoridis had made 26 appearances. He signed a new three-year contract in August 2020 and returned to match play in mid-January 2021, making 8 appearances during what remained of the 2020–21 season.

Despite frequently being named as a substitute, Chatzitheodoridis saw his playing time diminish and he made just six league appearances during the 2021–22 season. He made one appearance during the club's successful Greek Cup campaign and received a winner's medal. Chatzitheodoridis transferred out of the club in June 2022 and made 66 appearances, scoring four goals, during four seasons at the Leoforos Alexandras Stadium.

Panetolikos 
On 27 June 2022, Chatzitheodoridis signed a two-year contract with Super League club Panetolikos.

International career 
Chatzitheodoridis was an unused substitute for the Greece U21 team during two 2019 UEFA European U21 Championship qualifiers in October 2018.

Career statistics

Honours 
Panathinaikos

 Greek Cup: 2021–22

References

External links

 

1997 births
Living people
Greek footballers
Brentford F.C. players
Association football fullbacks
Greek expatriate footballers
Greek expatriate sportspeople in England
Cheltenham Town F.C. players
English Football League players
Panathinaikos F.C. players
Expatriate footballers in England
Super League Greece players
Footballers from Katerini
Panetolikos F.C. players